John Carmichael Kelly (21 February 1921 – 2 January 2001) was a Scottish footballer, who played as a left winger for Arthurlie, Celtic, Morton, Barnsley, Falkirk, Halifax Town and Portadown. Kelly represented Scotland twice, in 1949 British Home Championship matches against Wales and Ireland.

References

1921 births
2001 deaths
Footballers from Paisley, Renfrewshire
Association football wingers
Scottish footballers
Arthurlie F.C. players
Celtic F.C. players
Greenock Morton F.C. players
Barnsley F.C. players
Falkirk F.C. players
Halifax Town A.F.C. players
Portadown F.C. players
Scottish Football League players
English Football League players
Scotland international footballers
Scotland wartime international footballers
People from Barrhead
Scottish Junior Football Association players
Scotland junior international footballers
Sportspeople from East Renfrewshire